Newthorpe may refer to:
Newthorpe, Nottinghamshire
Newthorpe, North Yorkshire